Eric Bailey may refer to:

 Eric Bailey (politician) (1905–1989), British Conservative Member of Parliament for Manchester Gorton, 1931–1935
 Eric Bailey (GC) (1906–1946), Australian recipient of the George Cross
 Eric Bailey (basketball) (born 1960), Australian player with the Hobart Devils, Melbourne Tigers and Gold Coast Rollers
 Eric Bailey (American football) (born 1963), American football player
 Frederick Marshman Bailey (1882–1967), known as Eric, British Intelligence officer and explorer

See also
Eric Bailly (born 1994), Ivorian footballer
 Bailey (surname)